"Check Out the Chicken" is a song and debut single by Dutch production duo, Grandmaster Chicken & D.J. Duck. The song was released in 1989 peaked at number 20 in The Netherlands and Australia.

Track listing
 "Check Out the Chicken" - 4:18
 "Eggs" - 3:57

Charts

Weekly charts

Year-end charts

References

1989 singles
1989 songs
Warner Records singles